John Palmer (May 13, 1943 – May 15, 2020) was a Canadian theatre and film director and playwright.

Palmer was born May 13, 1943, in Sydney, Nova Scotia. Cofounder of several theatre companies in Toronto in the 1970s, Palmer was primarily a theatre director, whose credits include the original production of Brad Fraser's Wolfboy which marked the first acting role for Keanu Reeves.

Palmer directed two feature films, Me in 1975 and Sugar in 2004. He also directed/co-wrote the short film The Archer (2005), which is about the rise and fall of relationships. The film stars Kim Poirier, Dov Tiefenbach and Anthony Furey.

Palmer, who had dementia, died of COVID-19, in Ottawa, Ontario, on May 15, 2020, at age 77, during the COVID-19 pandemic in Ottawa.

Plays
 A Touch of God in the Golden Age (1971)
 The End (1972)
 A Day at the Beach (1987)
 Singapore (2001)

Filmography
 Me (1975)
 Sugar (2004)
 The Archer (2005)

References

External links

1943 births
2020 deaths
Canadian artistic directors
Canadian theatre directors
Deaths from the COVID-19 pandemic in Canada
Film directors from Nova Scotia
Film directors from Ottawa
Jewish Canadian writers
People from Sydney, Nova Scotia
Writers from Nova Scotia
Writers from Ottawa
Canadian gay writers
LGBT film directors
Canadian LGBT dramatists and playwrights
Canadian male dramatists and playwrights
20th-century Canadian dramatists and playwrights
21st-century Canadian dramatists and playwrights
20th-century Canadian male writers
21st-century Canadian male writers
Jewish Canadian filmmakers
Gay dramatists and playwrights
21st-century Canadian LGBT people
20th-century Canadian LGBT people